Arctolamia fruhstorferi is a species of beetle in the family Cerambycidae. It was described by Per Olof Christopher Aurivillius in 1902. It is known from Vietnam, China and Laos.

References

Lamiini
Beetles described in 1902